Deborah Ann Nickerson (1954 – December 24, 2021) was an American human genomics researcher. She was professor of genome sciences at the University of Washington. Nickerson founded and directed of one of the five clinical sites of the Gregor Consortium and was a major contributor to many genomics projects, including the Human Genome Project and the International HapMap Project. She found the gene for Miller syndrome with her colleagues Michael Bamshad and Jay Shendure.

Nickerson was born in Mineola, New York. She earned a bachelor's degree in biology from Adelphi University in 1974 and completed a PhD in immunology at the University of Tennessee in 1978. From 1978 to 1979, she pursued a postdoctoral fellowship in infectious diseases at the University of Kentucky. She worked at the University of South Florida and the California Institute of Technology before moving to the University of Washington in 1992.

Nickerson died of abdominal cancer in Seattle, Washington on December 24, 2021.

Selected publications

References

1954 births
2021 deaths
University of Washington faculty
University of South Florida faculty
California Institute of Technology faculty
Adelphi University alumni
University of Tennessee alumni
American geneticists
American women geneticists
People from Mineola, New York